Kampia, sometimes also spelled Kambia is a small village located in the Nicosia District of Cyprus, south of the town of Pera Orinis.

References

Communities in Nicosia District